Between 1994 and 2011 the City of Vincent, in Perth, Western Australia was known as the Town of Vincent. The city is located on the edge of inner city Perth, Western Australia and includes surrounding suburbs. There have been six mayors of Vincent: Jack Marks, John Hyde, Nick Catania, Alannah MacTiernan, John Carey and Emma Cole. Hyde, Catania, MacTiernan and Carey have served as Labor Party members of the Western Australian Legislative Assembly—Hyde and Carey served as mayor before entering Parliament, while Catania and MacTiernan served after leaving the state parliament. Carey was elected to the seat of Perth at the 2017 state election.

Mayors

References

Vincent
City of Vincent